"Demon to Lean On" is a song by American rock band Wavves, released on January 29, 2013, as the third single from the group's fourth album, Afraid of Heights (2013).

Charts

References 

2013 songs
2013 singles
Warner Records singles
Wavves songs
Song recordings produced by John Hill (record producer)